The 2011 Soul Train Music Awards was aired on November 27, 2011 on BET and Centric. The award ceremony was hosted by comedian and actor Cedric the Entertainer. The ceremony included special tributes to Gladys Knight and Earth Wind & Fire, both honorees received the Soul Train Legend Award. A special tribute performance was dedicated in memory of hip hop artist Heavy D, which include Doug E. Fresh, Kurtis Blow, and Whodini, Common and Naughty by Nature.

Special awards

Legend Award – Female
 Gladys Knight

Legend Award – Male
 Earth Wind & Fire

Winners and nominees
Winners are in bold text.

Album of the Year
 Chris Brown – F.A.M.E.
 Adele – 21
 Beyoncé – 4
 Jay Z and Kanye West – Watch the Throne
 Jill Scott – The Light of the Sun
 Trey Songz – Passion, Pain & Pleasure

Song of the Year
 Kelly Rowland  – "Motivation"
 Adele – "Rolling in the Deep"
 Chris Brown – "She Ain't You"
 Miguel – "Sure Thing"
 Jill Scott  – "So in Love"
 Kanye West  – "All of the Lights"

The Ashford & Simpson Songwriter’s Award
 Marsha Ambrosius – "Far Away"
 Written by: Marsha Ambrosius and Sterling Simms
 Adele – "Rolling in the Deep"
 Written by: Adele and Paul Epworth
 Beyoncé – "Best Thing I Never Had"
 Written by: Antonio Dixon, Kenneth Edmonds, Larry Griffin, Jr., Beyoncé Knowles, Caleb McCampbell, Patrick "J. Que" Smith and Shea Taylor
 Michael Jackson  – "Hold My Hand"
 Written by: Aliaune Thiam, Giorgio Tuinfort and Claude Kelly
 Raphael Saadiq – "Good Man"
 Written by: Raphael Saadiq and Taura Stinson

Best R&B/Soul Male Artist
 CeeLo Green
 Eric Benét
 Chris Brown
 R. Kelly
 Trey Songz

Best R&B/Soul Female Artist
 Jill Scott
 Marsha Ambrosius
 Beyoncé
 Mary J. Blige
 Jennifer Hudson
 Kelly Rowland

Best New Artist
 Miguel
 Marsha Ambrosius
 Bruno Mars
 Frank Ocean

Centric Award
 Raphael Saadiq
 Aloe Blacc
 Bilal
 Anthony David
 Ledisi

Best Hip-Hop Song of the Year
 Nicki Minaj  – "Moment for Life"
 Chris Brown  – "Look at Me Now"
 Lupe Fiasco  – "Out of My Head
 Jay Z and Kanye West  – "Otis"
 Kanye West  – "All of the Lights"

Best Gospel Performance
 Mary Mary – "Walking"
 James Fortune  – "I Believe"
 Kirk Franklin – "I Smile"
 Trin-i-tee 5:7 – "Heaven Hear My Heart"
 CeCe Winans – "More"

Best Dance Performance
 Beyoncé – "Run the World (Girls)"
 Chris Brown – "She Ain't You"
 Keri Hilson – "Pretty Girl Rock"
 Mary Mary – "Walking"
 Rihanna  – "What's My Name?"
 Kelly Rowland  – "Motivation"

CENTRICTV.com Awards

Best Soul Site
 Necole Bitchie

Best Caribbean Performance
 Rihanna – "Man Down"
 Vybz Kartel – "Summertime"
 Kes – "Wotless"
 Mavado – "Dililah"
 Machel Montano – "Bend Over"

Best Traditional Jazz Artist/Group
 Cassandra Wilson – Silver Pony
 Terri Lyne Carrington – The Mosaic Project
 Kevin Eubanks – Zen Food
 The Marsalis Family – Music Redeems
 Lizz Wright – Fellowship

Best Contemporary Jazz Artist/Group
 Dave Koz – Hello Tomorrow
 Boney James – Contact
 Foreplay – Let's Touch the Sky
 Michael Franks – Time Together
 Paul Hardcastle – Hardcastle IV

Performers
 The Original 7ven
 Melanie Fiona
 Miguel
 Mindless Behavior
 Lloyd
 Gladys Knight
 Keith Sweat
 Earth, Wind & Fire
 Anthony Hamilton
 BeBe Winans

Tribute performers
 Heavy D Tribute
 Doug E. Fresh
 Common
 Kurtis Blow
 Naughty by Nature
 Big Daddy Kane
 Whodini

 Earth Wind & Fire Tribute
 Zap Mama
 Miguel
 Musiq Soulchild
 Lalah Hathaway
 Boney James
 Eric Benét
 Joe
 Robin Thicke
 CeeLo Green
 Stokley Williams

 Gladys Knight Tribute
 Tamar Braxton
 Dave Hollister
 Kenny Lattimore
 Freddie Jackson
 Chrisette Michelle
 Marsha Ambrosius
 Mary Mary
 Natalie Cole

Telecast
The Soul Train Awards were aired on BET and Centric on November 27, 2011.

References

External links
 Soul Train Music Awards Winners (2011)

Soul Train Music Awards
Soul
Soul
Soul
Soul